Double Danger is a 1920 American short silent Western film directed by Albert Russell and featuring Hoot Gibson.

Plot summary

Cast
 Hoot Gibson
 Dorothy Wood
 Georgia Davey
 Charles Newton
 Jim Corey

See also
 List of American films of 1920
 Hoot Gibson filmography

External links
 

1920 films
1920 Western (genre) films
1920 short films
American silent short films
American black-and-white films
Films directed by Albert Russell
Universal Pictures short films
Silent American Western (genre) films
1920s American films
1920s English-language films